Nicola Rauti (born 17 April 2000) is an Italian professional footballer who plays as a forward for  club SPAL, on loan from Torino.

Club career

Torino

Loan to Monza
On 3 January 2020, Serie C side Monza announced the signing of Rauti on loan from Torino until the end of the season. On 12 January 2019, Rauti made his professional debut against Novara. Coming on as a substitute on the 91st minute, Rauti scored two minutes later from his first touch of the game; Monza won 3–0.

Loan to Palermo
On 28 September 2020, Rauti joined Palermo on loan.

Loan to SPAL
On 3 July 2022, Rauti joined SPAL on loan with an option to buy.

Career statistics

Club

Honours
Torino
 Coppa Italia Primavera: 2017–18
 Supercoppa Primavera: 2018

Monza
 Serie C Group A: 2019–20

Italy U18
 Mediterranean Games runner-up: 2018

References

External links
 
 
 

2000 births
Living people
People from Legnano
Sportspeople from the Metropolitan City of Milan
Footballers from Lombardy
Italian footballers
Association football forwards
Inter Milan players
Novara F.C. players
Torino F.C. players
A.C. Monza players
Palermo F.C. players
Delfino Pescara 1936 players
S.P.A.L. players
Serie C players
Serie B players
Italy youth international footballers
Mediterranean Games silver medalists for Italy
Mediterranean Games medalists in football
Competitors at the 2018 Mediterranean Games